Gyeongju Civic Stadium is a multi-use stadium in Gyeongju, South Korea. It is used mostly for football matches.

External links

Football venues in South Korea
Sports venues completed in 1979
1979 establishments in South Korea
Athletics (track and field) venues in South Korea